A. Schmitson was a German figure skater who competed in men's singles.

He won the silver medal at the first-ever European Figure Skating Championship (held in Hamburg in 1891).

Competitive highlights

References 

German male single skaters
Year of birth missing
Year of death missing
Date of birth missing
Date of death missing